The sixth season of the American animated television series The Simpsons originally aired on the Fox network between September 4, 1994, and May 21, 1995, and consists of 25 episodes. The Simpsons is an animated series about a working class family, which consists of Homer, Marge, Bart, Lisa, and Maggie. The show is set in the fictional city of Springfield, and lampoons American culture, society, television and many aspects of the human condition. Season 6 was the highest rated season of the series. 

The showrunner for the sixth production season was David Mirkin who executive-produced 23 episodes. Former showrunners Al Jean and Mike Reiss produced the remaining two; they produced the two episodes with the staff of The Critic, the show they left The Simpsons to create. This was done in order to relieve some of the stress The Simpsons writing staff endured, as they felt that producing 25 episodes in one season was too much. The episode "A Star Is Burns" caused some controversy among the staff, with Matt Groening removing his name from the episode's credits, as he saw it as blatant advertising for The Critic, which Fox had picked up for a second season after being cancelled by ABC and with which Groening had no involvement. Fox moved The Simpsons back to its original Sunday night timeslot from season 1, having aired on Thursdays from season 2 through season 5. It has remained in this slot ever since. The sixth season won one Primetime Emmy Award (for the episode "Lisa's Wedding"), and received three additional nominations. It also won the Annie Award for Best Animated Television Production.

The Complete Sixth Season DVD was released in the United States on August 16, 2005, September 28, 2005, in Australia, and October 17, 2005, in the United Kingdom. The set featured a plastic "clam-shell" Homer-head design and received many complaints. In the United States, the set contained a slip of paper informing purchasers how to request alternate packaging — which consisted of a case-sleeve in a similar style to the standard box design — for only a shipping and handling fee.

Production

David Mirkin served as showrunner and executive producer for season six, having worked in the same capacity on the previous season, while the season was produced by Gracie Films and 20th Century Fox Television. Due to Fox's demand for 25 episodes for the season, which the writers felt was impossible to achieve, former showrunners Mike Reiss and Al Jean returned to produce two episodes ("A Star Is Burns" and 'Round Springfield") with the staff of their show The Critic, to relieve some of the stress on The Simpsons writing staff.

David Cohen, Jonathan Collier, Jennifer Crittenden, Brent Forrester, Ken Keeler, Bob Kushell, David Sacks, Mike Scully, Joshua Sternin, and Jennifer Ventimilia all received their first writing credits during season six. Steven Dean Moore and Swinton O. Scott III received their first directing credit. Other credited writers included Greg Daniels, Dan McGrath, Bill Oakley, John Swartzwelder, Jon Vitti and Josh Weinstein. Other directors included Bob Anderson, Wes Archer, Susie Dietter, Mark Kirkland, Jeffrey Lynch, Jim Reardon and David Silverman.

The main cast consisted of Dan Castellaneta (Homer Simpson, Grampa Simpson, Krusty the Clown, among others), Julie Kavner (Marge Simpson, Patty and Selma Bouvier), Nancy Cartwright (Bart Simpson, Ralph Wiggum, Nelson Muntz, among others), Yeardley Smith (Lisa Simpson), Hank Azaria (Moe Szyslak, Apu, Chief Wiggum, among others) and Harry Shearer (Ned Flanders, Mr. Burns, Principal Skinner, among others). Other cast members included Doris Grau (Lunchlady Doris), Pamela Hayden (Milhouse Van Houten, among others), Tress MacNeille (Agnes Skinner, among others), Maggie Roswell (Maude Flanders, among others), Russi Taylor (Martin Prince, among others) and Marcia Wallace (Edna Krabappel). Guest stars included Anne Bancroft, Mel Brooks, Kelsey Grammer, Phil Hartman, Larry King, Susan Sarandon, Patrick Stewart, Meryl Streep and Winona Ryder.

The season's first two episodes, "Bart of Darkness" and "Lisa's Rival", were held over from the previous season, as production was delayed because of the 1994 Northridge earthquake. "A Star Is Burns" caused some controversy among the staff with series creator Matt Groening removing his name from the episode's credits as he saw it as blatant advertising for The Critic, which had moved from ABC to Fox for its second season and was scheduled to follow The Simpsons. The season finale "Who Shot Mr. Burns?" (which aired in two parts, the second acting as the following season's premiere) came from Groening, who had wanted to do an episode in which Mr. Burns was shot, which could be used as a publicity stunt. The writers decided to write the episode in two parts with a mystery that could be used in a contest. It was important for them to design a mystery that had clues, took advantage of freeze frame technology, and was structured around one character who seemed the obvious culprit.

During the production of the season, Groening and Brooks pitched a live-action spin-off series centered on Krusty the Clown (expected to be portrayed by Dan Castellaneta) entitled Krusty (although they began planning the series since 1992). Groening and Michael Weithorn wrote a pilot episode where Krusty moved to Los Angeles and got his own talk show. A recurring joke throughout the script was that Krusty lived in a house on wooden stilts which were continuously being gnawed by beavers. Eventually, the contract negotiations fell apart and Groening decided to stop work on the project.

Voice cast & characters

Main cast
 Dan Castellaneta as Homer Simpson, Grampa Simpson, Krusty the Clown, Groundskeeper Willie, Barney Gumble and various others
 Julie Kavner as Marge Simpson, Patty Bouvier, Selma Bouvier and various others
 Nancy Cartwright as Bart Simpson, Nelson Muntz, Ralph Wiggum and various others
 Yeardley Smith as Lisa Simpson
 Harry Shearer as Mr. Burns, Waylon Smithers, Ned Flanders, Principal Skinner, Lenny Leonard, Kent Brockman, Reverend Lovejoy, and various others
 Hank Azaria as Moe Szyslak, Chief Wiggum, Professor Frink, Comic Book Guy, Apu, Bumblebee Man and various others

Recurring
 Pamela Hayden as Milhouse van Houten, Jimbo Jones
 Maggie Roswell as Maude Flanders, Helen Lovejoy and Miss Hoover
 Russi Taylor as Martin Prince and Sherri and Terri
 Tress MacNeille as Agnes Skinner
 Marcia Wallace as Edna Krabappel
 Frank Welker as Santa's Little Helper, various animals

Guest stars

 Phil Hartman as Troy McClure, Lionel Hutz, Evan Conover, and Judah Ben-Hur (various episodes)
 Winona Ryder as Allison Taylor ("Lisa's Rival")
 Kelsey Grammer as Sideshow Bob ("Sideshow Bob Roberts")
 Larry King as himself ("Sideshow Bob Roberts")
 Dr. Demento as himself ("Sideshow Bob Roberts")
 Henry Corden as Fred Flintstone ("Sideshow Bob Roberts")
 James Earl Jones as an alternate timeline Maggie ("Treehouse of Horror V")
 Meryl Streep as Jessica Lovejoy ("Barts Girlfriend")
 Dennis Franz as himself playing Homer Simpson ("Homer Badman")
 Anne Bancroft as Dr. Zweig ("Fear of Flying")
 The cast of Cheers including Ted Danson as Sam Malone, Woody Harrelson as Woody Boyd, Rhea Perlman as Carla Tortelli, John Ratzenberger as Cliff Clavin and George Wendt as Norm Peterson ("Fear of Flying")
 Patrick Stewart as Number One ("Homer the Great")
 Dick Cavett as himself ("Homie the Clown")
 Johnny Unitas as himself ("Homie the Clown")
 Joe Mantegna as Fat Tony ("Homie the Clown")
 Mel Brooks as Himself ("Homer vs. Patty and Selma")
 Susan Sarandon as Ballet Teacher ("Homer vs. Patty and Selma")
 Jon Lovitz as Jay Sherman ("A Star Is Burns")
 Maurice LaMarche as George C. Scott, William Shatner, Jay Sherman's burp, and Eudora Welty's burp ("A Star Is Burns")
 Mandy Patinkin as Hugh Parkfield ("Lisa's Wedding")
 Ron Taylor as Bleeding Gums Murphy ("'Round Springfield")
 Steve Allen as himself ("'Round Springfield")
 Tito Puente as himself ("Who Shot Mr. Burns")

Reception
The season was critically acclaimed and remains popular among the show's fans. Reviews of the premiere "Bart of Darkness" in 1994 said the show was "just as strong and funny as it ever was," while the writing continued to be "crisp, hilarious and multi-layered." On Rotten Tomatoes, the sixth season of The Simpsons has a 100% approval rating based on 7 critical reviews. A 2010 appraisal of the show by IGN described the season as "hilarious", singling out the episodes "Treehouse of Horror V", "Itchy & Scratchy Land and "Bart vs. Australia" for praise. Entertainment Weeklys 2003 list of the show's best 25 episodes included four from this season: "Itchy & Scratchy Land", "Treehouse of Horror V", "Homer Badman" and "Who Shot Mr. Burns?".

Fox moved The Simpsons back to its original Sunday night time of 8 p.m., having aired it on Thursdays for the previous four seasons. It has remained in this slot ever since. The Simpsons was the network's "most popular series" and was moved in conjunction with Fox's purchase of the rights to the National Football League's National Football Conference games, which it would be airing on Sundays and was hoping would boost its Sunday night programs' ratings. Having been against The Cosby Show on Thursdays, the show was now against Lois & Clark: The New Adventures of Superman (ABC), seaQuest DSV (NBC) and Murder, She Wrote (CBS). "Bart of Darkness" finished 44th in the ratings for the week of August 29 to September 4, 1994, with a Nielsen rating of 8.9 and an audience share of 17%. The episode was the third highest rated show on the Fox network that week. This was down on the previous season's premiere "Homer's Barbershop Quartet" (12.7), and its finale "Secrets of a Successful Marriage" (9.8). The season finale "Who Shot Mr. Burns?" finished 51st with a rating of 8.7, the fifth highest rated Fox show of the week.

The sixth season won one Primetime Emmy Award, and received three additional nominations. "Lisa's Wedding" won the Emmy for "Outstanding Animated Program (for Programming One Hour or Less). Alf Clausen received a nomination in the category "Outstanding Individual Achievement in Music Composition for a Series (Dramatic Underscore)" for "Treehouse of Horror V", while he and John Swartzwelder were nominated for "Outstanding Individual Achievement in Music and Lyrics" for the Stonecutters' song "We Do" in the episode "Homer the Great". Finally, "Bart vs. Australia" was nominated for "Outstanding Individual Achievement in Sound Mixing for a Comedy Series or a Special". For the previous two seasons, the producers had nominated the show for Outstanding Comedy Series, failing each time. The show won the Annie Award for Best Animated Television Program in 1995 for season six, while Cartwright won the Annie for Voice Acting in the Field of Animation.

Episodes

DVD release

The DVD boxset for season six was released by 20th Century Fox Home Entertainment in the United States and Canada on August 16, 2005, ten years after it had completed broadcast on television. As well as every episode from the season, the DVD release features bonus material including deleted scenes, Animatics, and commentaries for every episode. The menus follow the same format as the previous season's set. The packaging was changed from the standard box design, used for the previous five seasons, to a plastic clamshell design shaped like Homer's head. After many fans complained of the format change, a standard box was produced, with a "Who Shot Mr. Burns?" theme. The season was not offered for retail sale in North America in the standard box, but people who had bought the head design and preferred the alternative were offered the standard box free of charge. In the United Kingdom, the Homer head packaging was released as a limited edition item, with only 50,000 copies using the design. All other copies used the standard box format. The next four seasons were subsequently released in both a standard and head-shaped packaging in North America, as well as overseas.

See also

 List of The Simpsons episodes

References

Bibliography

External links

 Season 6 at the BBC

Simpsons season 06
1994 American television seasons
1995 American television seasons